The Edgar Allan Poe Award for Best Novel was established in 1954. Only hardcover novels written by a published American author are eligible. Paperback original novels are eligible for the Edgar Allan Poe Award for Best Paperback Original. Debut novels by American novels are eligible for the Edgar Allan Poe Award for Best First Novel.

Winners for the Edgar Allan Poe Award for Best Novel are listed below.

Recipients

1950s

1960s

1970s

1980s

1990s

2000s

2010s

2020s

References 

Lists of writers by award
Mystery and detective fiction awards
Edgar Allan Poe Award
English-language literary awards
1954 awards